Jewish movements may refer to:

 Jewish political movements
 Jewish religious movements